Matataku Hoshi no Shita de (瞬く星の下で English: Under the twinkling stars) is the thirty-seventh single by the Japanese Pop-rock band Porno Graffitti. It was released on March 6, 2013. The song was used as the second opening of the anime series Magi: The Labyrinth of Magic.

Track listing

References

 

2013 singles
2013 songs
Anime songs
Porno Graffitti songs